First South West is a bus company operating services in the English counties of Somerset and Cornwall. It is a subsidiary of FirstGroup.

First South West includes the Kernow, Truronian, Adventures by Bus and Buses of Somerset brands.

History

First South West was known as 'First Devon & Cornwall' until 2015. This had been formed from two previous FirstGroup companies: Western National in Cornwall and south Devon, and Red Bus in north Devon. FirstGroup purchased independent Cornish operator Truronian in April 2008 and merged it into First Devon & Cornwall. First Somerset & Avon routes around Taunton and Bridgwater were transferred to First Devon & Cornwall in 2014 and rebranded as The Buses of Somerset.

On 6 September 2015, the Plymouth, Dartmouth and Tavistock garages were taken over by Stagecoach South West. Torpoint depot is being used to store the unused members of the fleet. At the same time, First Devon & Cornwall changed their name to First South West to reflect their new area of operation which is only in Cornwall and south Somerset.

In January 2020, Cornwall Council awarded the entire tendered bus network within the county to Plymouth Citybus, consisting of 73 routes. Kernow continues to operate their entire commercial network across Cornwall, including Tinner, University, Lizard and Coaster branded routes, as well as the 24, 27, 87 and 91.

Commencing from May 2021, First South West launched a number of services under the 'Adventures by Bus' brand across Cornwall, Devon and Somerset. These services are operated commercially and include a number of services that were previously operated by Kernow under different circumstances.

Routes
First South West routes cover much of Cornwall. It operates the Park & Ride service in Truro. In March 2015, First Kernow commenced operating some of Western Greyhound following its sudden closure.

Many routes are operated commercially and not under any tender or subsidy by the local council. Many of these fall within Cornwall, yet many other services are also operated commercially rather than under tenders such as the Adventures By Bus routes.

First South West operate the Taunton Park & Ride service under Buses of Somerset using Wright Streetlite vehicles in a two-tone orange and purple livery. This service is contracted under Taunton Council.

Adventures by Bus 
In May 2021, the 'Adventures by Bus' brand commenced operations across First South West's service area, with operations shared between the existing Kernow and Buses of Somerset divisions. The brand includes many seasonally operated routes. These include; The Dartmoor Explorer, Lands End Coaster, Falmouth Coaster, Atlantic Coaster, Exmoor Coaster, Lizard, Exeter Tour and Daytripper services. Many of these services operate using open-top vehicles across the summer season. The Atlantic Coaster, Lands End Coaster and The Lizard services operate on routes previously operated by Kernow. Adventures by Bus services operate out of multiple depots and outstations across the service area, all of which are owned and operated by either Kernow or Buses of Somerset. Adventures by Bus brought First services back to Devon for the first time since September 2015.

Fleet

As at April 2019 the fleet consisted of 296 buses and coaches.

First South West used to operate one of the older FirstGroup fleets with an average of 11.6 years, but investment in new buses has seen this figure decrease to 9.9 years. 
New purchases were made in 2016 and 2018 for the Kernow division. These were ADL Enviro400 MMCs, ADL Enviro200 MMCs and Optare Solo SRs. Most buses are second hand from within the FirstGroup fleet, they are large fleets of Plaxton Presidents on Volvo B7TL and Dennis Trident 2 chassis, Plaxton Pointer on Dennis Dart chassis, Optare Solo's and Mercedes-Benz Citaros.

Until December 2006 First South West operated the last sizeable fleet of Bristol VRT double-deck buses in the United Kingdom. Some of these Bristol VRTs were preserved.

As at May 2019, the oldest buses are Dennis Trident 2/Plaxton Presidents from 1998 operating out of Bridgwater depot. A Volvo Olympian has been preserved in the fleet.

Depots
Bridgwater
Camborne
Newquay
Penzance
Taunton
Truro
Yeovil

Outstations
Eden Project
Falmouth
Helston
Minehead
Padstow
Lee Moor (near Plymouth)
Callington, Cornwall

See also

List of bus operators of the United Kingdom

References

External links

First Kernow website (Cornwall buses)
Buses of Somerset website (Somerset buses)

FirstGroup bus operators in England
Bus operators in Cornwall
Bus operators in Somerset
Transport in Cornwall
Transport in Somerset